Sinis may refer to :

Places 
 Sinis peninsula in western Sardinia, forming the northern cape of the Bay of Oristano
 Titular see of Sinis, Catholic diocese
 Sinis, now called Sinno, a river in southern Italy

Other 
 Sinis (mythology), also known as Pityokamptes, a bandit killed by Theseus in Greek mythology
 Sinis, the name of a powerful Shade in the Myth (computer game series) slain by Alric in single combat